Etayi Constituency is an electoral constituency in the Omusati Region of Namibia. It had 34,970 inhabitants in 2004 and 16,716 registered voters . Its district capital is the settlement of  Etayi. The constituency contains the settlements of Iipandayamiti, Oneheke, Onheleiwa, Otindi, Ekangolinene, Oshivanda, Onamhindi, Omutundungu, Olupandu, Onampira, Otshikuyu, Oshipya, and Oikokola.

Politics
As in all constituencies in Omusati, SWAPO won the 2015 regional election by a landslide. Elisa Johannes gained 7,890 votes, while Sisilia Andreas of the Rally for Democracy and Progress (RDP) gained only 160. The SWAPO candidate also won the 2020 regional election by a large margin. Hans Haikali obtained 6,296 votes, followed by Apollos Haipindi of the Independent Patriots for Change (IPC), an opposition party formed in August 2020, with 877 votes.

References

Constituencies of Omusati Region
States and territories established in 1992
1992 establishments in Namibia